Eric Korita (born January 13, 1963) is a former professional tennis player from the United States. He was born in Chicago, Illinois.

Korita reached a career high singles ranking of world No. 46 on February 20, 1984 and won no grand prix tour titles.  He won 1 doubles title and achieved a career-high doubles ranking of world No. 30 on September 26, 1988.

Korita played college tennis at Southern Methodist University, where he was an All-American. 

During his tour playing days Korita resided in San Antonio, Texas with wife Mary.

Career finals

Doubles (1 win, 2 losses)

References

External links
 
 

American male tennis players
Sportspeople from Chicago
Sportspeople from San Antonio
SMU Mustangs men's tennis players
Tennis players from Chicago
Tennis people from Texas
Tennis players at the 1983 Pan American Games
Pan American Games medalists in tennis
1963 births
Living people
Pan American Games gold medalists for the United States
20th-century American people